Alpha Lambda Mu (:Alif Laam Meem in Arabic) is the first national Muslim fraternity in America. Alpha Lambda Mu was named for three letters that start several chapters of the Quran: Alif Laam Meem. The Fraternity was created by founder Ali Mahmoud and co-founder Araf Hossain. The fraternity's founding chapter was created at the University of Texas at Dallas on February 12, 2013. As of fall 2020, the fraternity has six active chapters and two colonies.

On March 23, 2013, the chapter at University of Texas at Dallas joined a protest against Domestic Violence to confront negative stereotypes of Muslim Men

Chapters
Active chapters are indicated in bold. Inactive chapters are indicated in italic.

References

Fraternities and sororities in the United States
Islamic organizations based in the United States
Student organizations established in 2013
2013 establishments in Texas